The Princess and the Pea is an IMAX film adaptation of the popular 1835 fairy tale "The Princess and the Pea" by Hans Christian Andersen written and directed by Curtis Linton, produced by Linton Films. Released May 19, 2001, the film lasted only 6 minutes.

The film was nominated twice for Motion Picture Sound Editors USA Golden Reel Award, in 2002 and 2003, for Best Sound Editing.

Among the cast members: Bruce Bohne (Papa Joe), Rusty Schwimmer (Mama Pat), Kirsten Moore (Princess Vee) and Hamilton von Watts (Billy Boy).

External links 
The Princess and the Pea (2001) - Movie details on Internet Movie Database (IMDb)
The Princess and the Pea, A Dramatic IMAX Fairy Tale By Curtis Linton - an article

2001 films
Films based on works by Hans Christian Andersen
IMAX short films
2001 comedy films
2001 short films
American comedy short films
Works based on The Princess and the Pea
Films based on fairy tales
Films scored by Sam Cardon
2000s English-language films
2000s American films